Mazenod College is an independent, Roman Catholic,  day-school for boys, located in Mulgrave, Victoria. It is one of three schools run by the Oblates of Mary Immaculate (OMI) and the only one in Victoria. Mazenod College is a member of the Associated Catholic Colleges. Currently, the principal is Dr Paul Shannon.

History and facilities
Mazenod College was founded in 1967 in St. Joseph's Primary School in nearby Springvale, Victoria to serve the parishes of Springvale, Clayton, Springvale North and Glen Waverley. In 1968, the school moved to its current location in Mulgrave, firstly utilising land on just the north side of Kernot Avenue.

Building progressed with the addition of multiple classrooms, a library, canteen, administration block and chapel, until in 1987 when further building began on the South side of Kernot Avenue.

Extensive sporting facilities include a cricket ground with a turf wicket area, a synthetic soccer pitch, a gymnasium, and the Provence Centre, a state of the art facility for volleyball, table tennis, and other sports, which also doubles as a school assembly venue.

Catholic identity 
Mazenod College is a Catholic College where faith is given great respect and centrality. Mass is celebrated every morning. A full school Mass (called The Inaugural Mass) is celebrated at St Patrick's Cathedral each year and full school masses are held on 21 May for Founder's Day (St Eugene De Mazenod's feast day), 15 August (Assumption of Mary) and an Advent Mass on the last day of school in preparation for Christmas.

Rector history 
The Rector of Mazenod College is appointed by the Provincial of the Missionary Oblates of Mary Immaculate who have the responsibility for the administration of the College and the Pastoral care of students. The appointment is confirmed by the Archbishop. 
The College's Rectors are:
 1967 – 1972: J. FitzPatrick O.M.I
 1973 – 1977: K. Davine O.M.I
 1978 – 1983: I. Mackintosh O.M.I
 1984 – 1988: P. Moroney O.M.I
 1989 – 1995: K. Davine O.M.I
 1996 – 2001: J. Sherman O.M.I
 2002 – 2009: P. Moroney O.M.I
 2010 – 2014: M. Twigg O.M.I
 2015 – 2019: C. Fini O.M.I
 2020 - Present: H. Dyer O.M.I

College houses 
 Charlebois (Light Blue) named after Bishop Ovide Charlebois OMI
 Cebula (Dark Blue) named after Jozef Cebula OMI
 Albini (Yellow) named after Father Charles Albini OMI
 Grandin (Red) named after Vital-Justin Grandin OMI
 Anthony (Maroon) named after Brother Anthony Kowalczyk OMI
 Gerard (Green) named after Joseph Gérard OMI
 Chisholm (Purple) named after Caroline Chisholm
 Mackillop (Grey) named after Mary MacKillop

Sport 
Mazenod is a member of the Associated Catholic Colleges (ACC).

ACC premierships 
Mazenod has won the following ACC premierships.

 Badminton (5) - 2013, 2014, 2015, 2018, 2022
 Basketball (2) - 2017, 2018
 Cricket - 2005
 Cricket T20 - 2020
 Hockey - 2002
 Lawn Bowls (2) - 2019, 2020
 Soccer (4) - 2016, 2017, 2018, 2019
 Swimming - 2011
 Table Tennis (11) - 2004, 2006, 2008, 2011, 2012, 2014, 2015, 2016, 2017, 2018, 2019
 Tennis (6) - 2005, 2010, 2012, 2013, 2014, 2015
 Volleyball (23) - 1999, 2000, 2001, 2002, 2003, 2004, 2005, 2006, 2007, 2008, 2009, 2010, 2011, 2012, 2014, 2015, 2016, 2017, 2018, 2019, 2020, 2021, 2022

Today 
Widely regarded as one of the best Catholic schools in Victoria, Mazenod College has over 1,400 students enrolled in the school and over 140 staff members. It also has several bands, including its symphony orchestra, string ensembles, 5 choirs, the Concert Band, The Symphonic Wind Band and multiple Jazz bands. In 2006, building works commenced and were completed in 2007. These included a brand new complex, called the Founder's Complex (opened on 25 March 2007), for the Computer Rooms, servers, Manual and Fine Arts Complex and the music tutorial provided by the college, renovations of the 'old' Manual and Fine Arts Centre (it became the Year 7 area) and a new building catering to the needs of maintenance and grounds staff. The new building also comprises staff amenities and equipment storage.

The College completed its full-sized cafeteria and multi-purpose centre in 2009, the biggest development since the Founders Complex. The cafeteria is only accessible to Year 12 Students and the VCAL class.

The Year 12 Complex has also been refurbished. It now has a new covered verandah and seating area.

The Provence Centre officially opened in May 2013 for the Founder's Day Mass. The complex is named after the region in France where St Eugene de Mazenod is from. With an underground car park, it will also house assemblies, masses and a variety of sports activities. The school has a strong focus on sport, notably volleyball.

An updated College Logo was implemented during 2018-2019, with a darker-blue shield background. The new logo also changed the location of the fleur de lis making them now on the shield underneath the cross. The lower banner with the College motto was also altered, changing from white to dark blue, and having the overall shape being less curvy and more neat.

International relationships
Mazenod College currently has a close relationship with an overseas school; Daisho Gakuen College in Osaka, Japan. This relationship was formed to strengthen Mazenod's LOTE department, giving students the invaluable opportunity to come in contact with Japanese students (one of the three languages are available for study at Mazenod). Each year Mazenod and its brother school overseas undertake a student exchange study trip, with Mazenod students travelling to Osaka for a study trip and students from Daisho travelling to Melbourne on exchange for a short period. This usually occurs in alternating years.

International Oblate Youth Encounter 2008
On 9 July through to 13 July 2008, Mazenod College hosted the International Oblate Youth Encounter for over 800 pilgrims from around the world. This gathering was the Oblate Preparation for the World Youth Day to be held in Sydney. Over 150 current and former students took part in the Encounter and World Youth Day.

50th Anniversary 
In 2017, Mazenod College celebrated its 50th anniversary, after it was founded in 1967. To make this anniversary a memorable one, the college based the motto for Mazenod's 50th anniversary was: To Remember, To Celebrate and To Become. Mazenod celebrated its history through significant events such as the Inaugural Mass, Founders Day and Mazenod's 50th anniversary speech night, which was highlighted by the appearance of Mazenod's first school captain through a video.

Notable alumni 
VFL/AFL
 Matt Johnson (Footscray)
 Silvio Foschini (Sydney Swans, St Kilda)
 Aldo Dipetta (St Kilda, Sydney Swans)
 Chris Sullivan (Melbourne, Richmond)
 Carl Steinfort (Collingwood, Geelong)
 Matthew Boyd (Western Bulldogs)
 Heath Black (Fremantle, St Kilda)
 Andrew Carrazzo (Carlton)
 Scott Thornton (Fremantle)
 Ashley Hansen (West Coast Eagles)
Matthew Arnot (Richmond)
Alex Woodward (Hawthorn)
David Mirra (Hawthorn)
Jake Soligo (Adelaide)
Miller Bergman (North Melbourne)
Football

 Nishan Velupillay (Melbourne Victory)
 Jordi Valadon (Melbourne City)
 Barath Suresh (SC Germania Erftstadt-Lechenich)

Hockey
 Chris Ciriello (Australia men's national field hockey team)

Tennis
Peter Luczak (Australian Davis Cup Representative)
Andrew Florent

Athletics
 Peter Robertson (World Champion Triathlete)
 Jeffrey Riseley (Australian representative to the 2012 Olympics in Athletics

Food
George Calombaris (Award-winning chef and judge on Masterchef Australia)

Television
Gerard Whateley (Co-host of Fox Footy's AFL 360 program and ABC media commentator)

Music
Damian Cowell (Lead vocalist and drummer of ARIA Award-winning band TISM (as Humphrey B. Flaubert) and later of Root! and The DC3)

Volleyball
Damien Schumann (Gold Medalist in Beach Volleyball in the Commonwealth Games)

References

External links 
 Mazenod College Website

Catholic secondary schools in Melbourne
Associated Catholic Colleges
Educational institutions established in 1967
Boys' schools in Victoria (Australia)
1967 establishments in Australia
Buildings and structures in the City of Monash